Goose Lake is a city in Clinton County, Iowa, United States. The population was 239 at the time of the 2020 census.

History
Goose Lake was platted in 1889, and it was incorporated in 1908. It took its name from nearby Goose Lake.

Geography
Goose Lake is located at  (41.967403, -90.380724).

Demographics

2010 census
As of the census of 2010, there were 240 people, 89 households, and 61 families living in the city. The racial makeup of the city was 99.2% White and 0.8% from two or more races.

There were 89 households, of which 40.4% had children under the age of 18 living with them, 56.2% were married couples living together, 10.1% had a female householder with no husband present, 2.2% had a male householder with no wife present, and 31.5% were non-families. 28.1% of all households were made up of individuals, and 11.3% had someone living alone who was 65 years of age or older. The average household size was 2.70 and the average family size was 3.39.

The median age in the city was 35.8 years. 32.5% of residents were under the age of 18; 8% were between the ages of 18 and 24; 28.3% were from 25 to 44; 18.3% were from 45 to 64; and 12.9% were 65 years of age or older. The gender makeup of the city was 48.8% male and 51.3% female.

2000 census
As of the census of 2000, there were 232 people, 84 households, and 61 families living in the city. The racial makeup of the city was 97.84% White, and 2.16% from two or more races. Hispanic or Latino of any race were 0.43% of the population.

There were 84 households, out of which 40.5% had children under the age of 18 living with them, 63.1% were married couples living together, 6.0% had a female householder with no husband present, and 26.2% were non-families. 23.8% of all households were made up of individuals, and 11.9% had someone living alone who was 65 years of age or older. The average household size was 2.76 and the average family size was 3.21.

In the city, the population was spread out, with 31.5% under the age of 18, 6.9% from 18 to 24, 30.6% from 25 to 44, 20.3% from 45 to 64, and 10.8% who were 65 years of age or older. The median age was 33 years. For every 100 females, there were 121.0 males. For every 100 females age 18 and over, there were 103.8 males.

The median income for a household in the city was $43,125, and the median income for a family was $48,523. Males had a median income of $31,875 versus $22,679 for females. The per capita income for the city was $15,453. None of the families and 2.6% of the population were living below the poverty line.

Education
The Northeast Community School District operates public schools serving the community.

References

Cities in Iowa
Cities in Clinton County, Iowa
1889 establishments in Iowa